Harley Race's Wrestling Academy is a professional wrestling school located in Troy, Missouri. It was established in 1999 by former NWA World Heavyweight Champion, Harley Race. Students of the school are incorporated into the professional wrestling promotion World League Wrestling.

History

School
The Harley Race Wrestling Academy was operated by Harley Race. It provides training programs for those looking to enter the professional wrestling industry. The objective of the program is to "Teach safe wrestling technique, draw on Harley Race's experience and to give students tools to succeed in professional wrestling". Programs include both courses to become a professional wrestler, which requires anywhere between 300–500 hours of training, and professional wrestling referee training, which entails 60 hours of training. It is now called "Attack the Mat" Wrestling school and is operated by Leland Race.

The school has two wrestling rings and weight room. The school is attended mostly by men, but occasionally women join as well.

The school initially put on local wrestling events that raised money for local charities in Missouri. The wrestling school later began a running partnership with Pro Wrestling Noah that includes many of the program's talent touring with the Japanese-based wrestling promotion. YouTube celebrity OutlawDipper has stated in his previous videos that he attended this wrestling school and lived in Eldon, Missouri.

History of World League Wrestling

In 1999, Race began World Legion Wrestling, (WLW), an independent professional wrestling promotion that integrates current and past students of the Harley Race Wrestling Academy. At first they did television for the America One Television Network, and added their show to the weekly line-up of a different wrestling promotion every night at 11:00 p.m. eastern time. After they lost their TV, they changed their name to World League Wrestling, and continued promoting in the Missouri area. World League Wrestling is based out of Troy, Missouri, and puts on approximately 11 shows a year. The slogan for the company is Shut up and wrestle, which expresses its theme of more old-school wrestling and less "showboating". The promotion is family-style professional wrestling entertainment that excludes nudity and swearing. The shows also sometimes features guest wrestlers. The academy was located in Eldon, Missouri before moving to Troy, Missouri in early 2014. It has returned on tv on stations like KMIZ in Columbia Missouri and NUDU tv in Houston Texas.

Current champions

References

Further reading

External links
Harley Race's Wrestling Academy: Official Website
Harley Race Wrestling Academy Brochure

Education companies established in 1999
Companies based in Missouri
Professional wrestling schools
1999 establishments in Illinois
Professional wrestling in Missouri
Independent professional wrestling promotions based in the Midwestern United States